{{DISPLAYTITLE:C19H22O3}}
The molecular formula C19H22O3 (molar mass: 298.38 g/mol) may refer to:

 Auraptene, a natural bioactive monoterpene coumarin ether
 Doisynoestrol, a synthetic nonsteroidal estrogen of the doisynolic acid group
 Nematal 105, also known as 4-Pentylphenyl 4-methoxybenzoate

References